Religious practice within Spiritism is mostly limited to praying. All other activities are seen as not religious, but as charitable work. Spiritist meetings are not for worshipping.

Membership
All practices taking place within the centres are free of charge, adhering to the Gospel principle that we must "Give for free what we receive for free." Attendees may actually be asked for contribution if they become regular, but generally only if they become formal members - which is more or less the same process as enlisting with a political party.

The Spiritist centre

The practice of Spiritism is held without exterior trappings, within the Christian principle that God should be adored in spirit and truth. A Spiritist Centre has no exterior mark of its use, except for a (usually discreet) plate or sign bearing its name (often that of the founder or of a spiritual patron). They do not use icons, idols, crosses, pictures, etc. The presence of any such objects in a place purporting to practice Kardecist Spiritism is sometimes considered the surest proof they are not what they claim to be, as The Spirits' Book clearly states that spirits actually do not have any recognisable form (unless they have disincarnated recently).

Ministry

There is no ministry within Spiritism; neither does it adopt or use in its meetings or in its practices any of the following: vestments, alcoholic beverages, incense, tobacco, altars, banners, candles, processions, talismans, amulets, sacraments, the making of promises and the paying of penances, horoscopes, fortune telling with cards or sea shells, pyramids, crystals, rituals or any other form of material support. However, Spiritist Centres usually are dedicated buildings, in the sense that they usually must follow some architectural guidelines. People willing to take part in mediunic meetings are often asked not to eat meat or ingest alcohol, coffee or drugs (including tobacco) beforehand, though such is not strictly forbidden.

Proselytism
Spiritism does not impose its principles. It invites all those who are interested in getting to know them to submit its teachings to the test of reason before accepting them. Spiritists believe salvation is achieved by work and that any formal (or informal) religion is valid if it follows the basic commandments of God and helps people endure the hardships of life. Affiliation to Spiritism is, therefore, regarded as an option for those who do not feel their religious needs fulfilled.

Mediumship
Mediumship, which permits the Spirits to communicate with Man, is a gift which effectively everyone has, independent of doctrinal guidance. Fully developed mediumship, however, is a rarer gift that must often be developed. Spiritist Mediumship is only that which is practiced based upon the principles of the Spiritist Doctrine and within Christian morality (generally, it mustn't be done for money, fame or vanity).).

Social campaigns
There is a strong campaign against abortion, capital punishment and suicide. Spiritists believe abortion is murder and that suicide is an act of ignorance that leads to worsening of the conditions of a future life.

Prayer
Prayer is deemed to be important to allow oneself to stay in tune with his spiritual friends and protectors. It is especially useful to fight or prevent obsession. Praying helps to clear the mind of bad feelings and prepares the spirit for higher achievements. The prayer does not need to follow a strict formula, but should come from within the follower, and it should express their true belief in, and dedication to, God. Spiritist prayer is not formulaic, but reflects the person's current state of mind, much like Evangelical prayer. The most frequent subject of prayer is asking for the guidance of God.

Charity
Doing charity work is of utmost importance. According to the doctrine, we should be willing to donate not only material resources, but also the better share of our love and care for the less fortunate.

Culture
Spiritists are prompted to read a lot. Spiritist Centres usually have libraries and many publishing houses distribute cheap paperback editions of a myriad books in all genres, including literature, science, philosophy, history, poetry, etc. Spiritist authors are often expected to donate their copyright to works of charity or charge low amounts for it (as the purpose of a book is to be read and many people can't afford to buy expensive books).

References

Practice, Spiritist
Religious practices by religion